Year 1138 (MCXXXVIII) was a common year starting on Saturday (link will display the full calendar) of the Julian calendar.

Events 
 By place 

 Europe 
 March 7 – Conrad III is elected as King of Germany, in the presence of the papal legate Theodwin at Koblenz. He is crowned at Aachen six days later (on March 13), and acknowledged in Bamberg by several German princes of southern Germany. Henry X (the Proud), son-in-law and heir of the late King Lothair III, refuses his allegiance to Conrad. He is deprived of all his Saxon territories, which are given to Leopold IV (the Generous). 
 Summer – A civil war breaks out in the Holy Roman Empire, a struggle begins between the Guelphs and Ghibellines, while the family name Welf of Henry X will be corrupted into Guelph. 
 October 20 – Bolesław III (Wrymouth) dies after a 31-year reign. He divides Poland among his sons: Władyslaw II (the Exile) receives Silesia and the Senioral territories – which includes the Kraków and Łęczyca regions, as well as parts of Kujawy and Wielkopolska ("Greater Poland"). Bolesław IV (the Curly) receives Masovia and Mieszko III receives the newly established Duchy of Greater Poland. The 7-year-old Henry becomes duke of Sandomierz. Bolesław's last son, Casimir II receives nothing, as he is born after his father's death.

 England 
 May – Earl Robert FitzRoy rebels against King Stephen, supporting Matilda (his step-sister) in her claim for the English throne. Matilda is given refuge by Earl William de Albini at Arundel Castle. Stephen built siege works around the castle, but is unable to break the castle's defences. In France, Matilda's husband Duke Geoffrey V (the Fair) takes advantage of the situation by re-invading Normandy. 
 August 22 – Battle of the Standard: King David I of Scotland gives his full support to Matilda (daughter of the late King Henry I), and invades the north of England – traveling as far south as Lincolnshire. The Scottish army (some 15,000 men) is defeated by English forces under Earl William le Gros in Yorkshire. David retreats to Carlisle and reassembles an army. 
 The Earldom of Pembroke, created for Gilbert de Clare, becomes the first earldom created by Stephen within the borders in Wales. Gilbert receives the rape and Pevensey Castle. 

 Middle East 
 Spring – Emperor John II (Komnenos) leads a Byzantine expeditionary force into Syria and arrives before the walls of Aleppo on April 20. The city proves too strong to attack, but the fortresses of Biza'a, Athareb, Maarat al-Numan and Kafartab are taken by assault. While the Byzantines besiege the city of Shaizar, the Crusader allies Prince Raymond of Poitiers of Antioch and Count Joscelin II of Edessa remain in their camp playing dice.
 Siege of Shaizar: The Byzantines under John II besiege the capital of the Munqidhite Emirate. They capture the lower city on May 20, but fail to take the citadel. John negotiates with Emir Abu'l Asakir Sultan – who sends him an offer to pay a large indemnity and becoming a vassal of the Byzantine Empire. John, disgusted by his Crusader allies, accepts the terms and raises the siege on May 21.
 October 11 – An earthquake in Aleppo, Syria, kills about 230,000 people.
 Al-Rashid Billah (Deposed caliph of Baghdad) fled to Isfahan where he was assassinated by a team of four Nizari Ismailis (Assassins) in June 1138. This was celebrated in Alamut for a week by Shias.

 Asia 
 November 5 – Lý Anh Tông is enthroned as emperor of Đại Việt at the age of two, starting a 37-year reign.

 By topic 

 Religion 
 April 10 – Robert Warelwast is nominated as bishop of Exeter at a royal council in Northampton, England.

Births 
 Casimir II (the Just), duke of Poland (d. 1194)
 Conan IV (the Young), duke of Brittany (d. 1171)
 Fujiwara no Narichika, Japanese nobleman (d. 1178)
 Hōjō Tokimasa, Japanese nobleman and regent (d. 1215)
 Saladin (the Lion), sultan of Egypt and Syria (d. 1193)
 Taira no Shigemori, Japanese nobleman (d. 1179)
 Tancred ("the Monkey King"), king of Sicily (d. 1194)

Deaths 
 January 13 or January 14 – Simon I, duke of Lorraine (b. 1076)
 February 19 – Irene Doukaina, Byzantine empress 
 May 11 – William de Warenne, 2nd Earl of Surrey
 May 27 – Hadmar I of Kuenring, German nobleman 
 June 6 – Al-Rashid, caliph of the Abbasid Caliphate (b. 1109)
 August 12 – Suero Vermúdez, Asturian nobleman
 October 28 – Bolesław III (Wrymouth), duke of Poland (b. 1086)
 Amhlaoibh Mór mac Fir Bhisigh, Irish poet and cleric
 Arwa al-Sulayhi, queen and co-ruler of Yemen (b. 1048)
 Avempace, Andalusian polymath and philosopher (b. 1085)
 Chen Yuyi, Chinese politician of the Song Dynasty (b. 1090)
 David the Scot, bishop of Bangor (approximate date)
 Kiya Buzurg Ummid, ruler of the Nizari Isma'ili State
 Rodrigo Martínez, Leonese nobleman and diplomat
 Rudolf of St. Trond, French Benedictine chronicler
 Someshvara III, ruler of the Western Chalukya Empire
 Vakhtang (or Tsuata), Georgian nobleman (b. 1118)

References